The Presbyterian Church in Korea (HapDongGaeHyuk) was formed when a split occurred in the Presbyterian Church in Korea (HapDong) it was the third non-mainline Presbyterian denomination, the Presbyterian Church in Korea (Chungham) or (HapDongBoSu). In 1984 it adopted the current name. The Apostles Creed and Westminster Confession are the standards. In 2004 it had 84,000 members in 1,200 congregations and 1,250 ordained ministers. It had 26 Presbyteries and a General assembly.

References 

Presbyterian denominations in South Korea
Presbyterian denominations in Asia